Rex Albert Wilson (born 10 April 1960 in Wanganui, Manawatū-Whanganui) is a retired male long-distance runner from New Zealand, who represented his native country at the 1992 Summer Olympics in Barcelona, Spain. There he finished in 16th place in the men's marathon, clocking 2:15:51. He set his personal best (2:10:48) in the classic distance in 1990.

Achievements

References

1960 births
Living people
New Zealand male long-distance runners
Athletes (track and field) at the 1990 Commonwealth Games
Athletes (track and field) at the 1992 Summer Olympics
Olympic athletes of New Zealand
Commonwealth Games competitors for New Zealand